Mostafa Salimi (12 February 1904 – 13 February 1994) was an Iranian football player and manager. He was head coach of Iran national football team from 1951 to 1952 after served as assistant coach of the national team for more than ten years. He was President of Football Federation of Iran from 1955 to 1956.

References 

1904 births
1994 deaths
Presidents of Iranian Football Federation
Iran national football team managers
Iranian football managers
Iranian footballers
People from Lahijan
Association football forwards